The Southern League (SL) is a Minor League Baseball league that operates in the United States at the Double-A level, which is two grades below Major League Baseball. A champion has been determined at the end of each season since the league was formed in 1964. 

Through 1970, champions were the regular-season pennant winners—the team with the best win–loss record at the conclusion of the regular season. The 1971 title was decided in a postseason series between the two teams with the best records. From 1972 to 1975, the winners of each of two divisions competed in a series to determine champions. The league operated using a split season format from 1976 to 2020. Under this format, the winners of each half within each division played for the division championship, and the division winners met to play for the SL title. The 2021 winner was crowned via a series between the two teams with the best full-season records. As of 2022, the winners of each division from both the first and second halves of the season meet in a best-of-three division series, with the winners of the two division series meeting in a best-of-three championship series.

The Birmingham Barons have won seven Southern League championships, more than any other team, followed by the Jacksonville Suns (6) and Montgomery Rebels (5). Among active SL franchises, Birmingham has won seven championships, the most of all teams, followed by the Chattanooga Lookouts and Tennessee Smokies (3).

History

The Southern League was founded in 1964. A league champion has been determined at the end of each season. Champions from 1964 to 1970 were simply the regular-season pennant winners—the team with the best win–loss record at the conclusion of the regular championship season. The first league champions were the Lynchburg White Sox, who won by one game over the Birmingham Barons in 1964.

In 1971, the league merged with the Texas League to form the Dixie Association, an interleague partnership in which they played an interlocking schedule, and the leagues' champions met to determine a Dixie Association champion. The Southern League championship was determined via a best-of-three playoff series between the top two teams in the league, based on winning percentage. The top-seeded Charlotte Hornets defeated the  Asheville Tourists, 2–1. Charlotte then won the Dixie Association title over the Texas League champion Arkansas Travelers, in three-straight games. The partnership was dissolved after the season.

The Southern League divided its teams into two divisions in 1972. From 1972 to 1975, the winners of each division met in a best-of-five series to determine a champion. In 1976, the circuit adopted a split season format while maintaining its divisional alignment.  Under this arrangement, the schedule was split into two parts. The team with the best record in each division at the end of the first half won the first-half division title. Standings were then reset so that all clubs had clean records to begin the second half. Second-half division titles were decided in the same manner. Then, the first and second-half winners in each division met to determine division champions. These winners played for the Southern League championship.

The first four-team playoff, held in 1976, was won by the Western Division champion Montgomery Rebels over the Eastern Division champion Orlando Twins, 3–1. The 1976 playoffs featured a one-game semifinal divisional round and a best-of-five championship series. Both rounds were the best-of-three in 1977 and 1978. The 1979 playoffs had a best-of-three divisional round and a best-of-five final. From 1980 to 2020, both rounds were the best-of-five. Initially, if one team won both halves, they received a bye into the championship round. Beginning in 1982, the team in that division with the second-place full-season record was awarded a wild card berth and became the division champion's opponent. 

The 2020 season was cancelled due to the COVID-19 pandemic. The Southern League ceased operations before the 2021 season in conjunction with Major League Baseball's (MLB) reorganization of Minor League Baseball. In place of the league, MLB created the Double-A South. Prior to the 2022 season, MLB renamed the Double-A South the Southern League, and it carried on the history of the circuit prior to reorganization. In 2021, the Double-A South held a best-of-five series between the two teams with the best records, regardless of division standings, to determine a league champion. The top-seeded Mississippi Braves bested the Montgomery Biscuits, 3–2, for the title.

In 2022, the Southern League returned to the split-season divisional format it has used for the majority of its existence. The winners of each half in a division vie for the division championship. The second-place overall team is awarded a wild card berth in the event the same team wins both halves. The division champions then compete for the Southern League championship. Both rounds are the best-of-three games.

Champions

Pre-playoff champions (1964–1970)

Playoff champions (1971–present)

Wins by team

Active Southern League teams appear in bold.

Notes

References
Specific

General

Champions
Southern League champions
Southern League
Southern League